The flora of Wales refers to the plant life in Wales.

Trees 
The sessile oak (Quercus petraea), one of Wales' most common species, can be found across the region. English holly (Ilex aquifolium), one of the few native evergreen trees, can be found in southern Wales. The wych elm (Ulmus glabra), a native species, suffers from disease and competition introduced by exotic species.

Flowers 
The cuckoo flower (Cardamine pratensis), a herbaceous perennial, can be found throughout Wales. Bog rosemary (Andromeda polifolia), a small flowering shrub, can be found in central Wales. Within the British Isles, the Snowdon lily (Gagea serotina) is found only on the slopes of Snowdon.

Important Plant Areas 
Important Plant Areas (IPAs) in Wales are areas of "the highest botanical importance" as determined by Plantlife.

References